"Another Day" is a song by Roy Harper from his album Flat Baroque and Berserk.

The song has been covered by various artists that include: Susanna and the Magical Orchestra from the album 3; This Mortal Coil featuring the vocals of Elizabeth Fraser on the album It'll End in Tears; Kate Bush and Peter Gabriel who recorded a duet for her 1979 television special. The cover by Bush led to collaboration with Harper; including him singing backing vocals on her 1980 song "Breathing" and her duetting on the track "You" on Harper's album The Unknown Soldier in the same year.

Notes

External links

1970 songs
Roy Harper (singer) songs